An agent-owned company is a private company, controlled by its agents, for which it provides common marketing and business coordination. It is common in the moving company sector, where moves are performed by local agents, under a national brand.

See also
 Retailers' cooperative